Moojan Momen is a retired physician and historian specializing in Baháʼí studies who has published numerous books and articles about the Baháʼí Faith and Islam, especially Shia Islam, including for Encyclopædia Iranica the British Library, and is a Fellow of the Royal Asiatic Society of Great Britain and Ireland.

His book An introduction to Shi'i Islam was used as required reading in university and seminary courses on Shia Islam. He won the 7th annual Thomas Robbins Award for Excellence in the Study of New Religious Movements in 2009 for his article “Millennialism and Violence: The Attempted Assassination of Nasir al-Din Shah of Iran by the Babis in 1852.” He is an editor of Baháʼí Studies Review and serves as a faculty member at the Bahá'í Wilmette Institute.

He was born 1950, in Tabriz, Iran, but the family migrated to England in 1955 where he was educated at Queen's College, Taunton, St John's College, Cambridge, and Guy's Hospital (teaching hospital), London. He is married to another scholar/publisher Wendi Momen.

Articles

Articles in Encyclopaedia Iranica
 Adíb Tálaqání (Hand of the Cause), by Moojan Momen, in Encyclopaedia Iranica, Volume 1 (1985)
 Afnán: Genealogy of the Afnān Family, by Moojan Momen, in Encyclopaedia Iranica, Volume 1 (1985)
 Alí Akbar Shahmírzádí (Hájjí Akhund), by Moojan Momen, in Encyclopaedia Iranica, Volume 1 (1985)
 Amín Hájjí: trustees of Huqúqu'lláh, by Moojan Momen, in Encyclopaedia Iranica, Volume 1 (1985)
 Badasht, by Moojan Momen, in Encyclopaedia Iranica, Volume 3 (1989)
 Baha'i Pioneers, by Moojan Momen, in Encyclopaedia Iranica (2013)
 Bahá'í Conventions, by Moojan Momen, in Encyclopaedia Iranica, Volume 3 (1989)
 Bahá'íyyih Khánum, by Moojan Momen, in Encyclopaedia Iranica, Volume 3 (1989)
 Balyuzi, H. M., by Moojan Momen, in Encyclopaedia Iranica, Volume 3 (1989)
 Chase, Thornton, by Moojan Momen, in Encyclopaedia Iranica, Volume 5 (1992)
 Cosmogony and Cosmology, by Moojan Momen, in Encyclopaedia Iranica, Volume 6 (1993)
 Dhikr: in the Bábí and Bahá'í Religions, by Moojan Momen, in Encyclopaedia Iranica, Volume 7 (1996)
 Divorce, by Moojan Momen, in Encyclopaedia Iranica, Volume 7 (1996)
 Dolgorukov Memoirs, by Moojan Momen, in Encyclopaedia Iranica, Volume 7 (1996)
 Fayzí, Abu'l-Qásim (Hand of the Cause), by Moojan Momen, in Encyclopaedia Iranica, Volume 9 (1999)
 Festivals, Bahá'í, by Moojan Momen, in Encyclopaedia Iranica, Volume 9 (1999)
 Fádl Mázandarání, Mírzá Asadu'lláh, by Moojan Momen, in Encyclopaedia Iranica, Volume 9 (1999)
 Haydar Alí Isfahání, by Moojan Momen, in Encyclopaedia Iranica, Volume 12 (2004)
 Hidden Words (Kalemát-i-Maknuna), by Moojan Momen, in Encyclopaedia Iranica (2011)
 House of Justice (Baytu'l-'Adl), by Moojan Momen, in Encyclopaedia Iranica, Volume 3 (1989)
 Lawh (Tablet), by Moojan Momen and Todd Lawson, in Encyclopaedia Iranica (2005)
 Martyrs, Bábí, by Peter Smith and Moojan Momen, in Encyclopaedia Iranica (2005)
 Mashriqu'l-Adhkár, by Moojan Momen, in Encyclopaedia Iranica (2010)
 Mazhar-i Ilahi (Manifestation of God), by Moojan Momen, in Encyclopaedia Iranica (2016)
 Mírzá Abu'l-Fadl Gulpáyegání, by Moojan Momen, in Encyclopaedia Iranica, Volume 1 (1985)
 Nineteen Day Feast, by Moojan Momen, in Encyclopaedia Iranica (2014)
 Sabet, Habib, by Moojan Momen, in Encyclopaedia Iranica (2015)
 Shoghi Effendi, by Moojan Momen, in Encyclopaedia Iranica (2011)
 Sobhi, Fazlollah Mohtadi, by Moojan Momen, in Encyclopaedia Iranica (2015)
 Spiritual Assembly (Mahfel-i-Ruháni), by Moojan Momen, in Encyclopaedia Iranica (2011)
 Vahíd (Sayyed Yahyá Dárábí), by Moojan Momen, in Encyclopaedia Iranica, Volume 7 (1996)
 Women in the works of the Bab and in the Babi Movement, by Moojan Momen, in Encyclopaedia Iranica (2011)
 Zuhur al-Haqq, by Moojan Momen, in Encyclopaedia Iranica (2002)

Chapters in books

Books

References

British Bahá'ís
Living people
Year of birth missing (living people)
People educated at Queen's College, Taunton